The 1929–30 Serie A was the 30th football tournament in Italy. Internazionale won its third Scudetto as Ambrosiana. This was the first edition of the Serie A using a round-robin format.

Teams
The 18 clubs were the first 9 of each group of 1928–29 Divisione Nazionale.

Final classification

Results

Top goalscorers

References

Sources

Almanacco Illustrato del Calcio - La Storia 1898-2004, Panini Edizioni, Modena, September 2005
Il Littoriale - years 1929 and 1930
La Stampa - years 1929 and 1930

External links
 All results with goalscorers on RSSSF Website.
 emeroteca.coni.it

Serie A seasons
Italy
1929–30 in Italian football leagues